The blood vessels are the components of the circulatory system that transport blood throughout the human body. These vessels transport blood cells, nutrients, and oxygen to the tissues of the body. They also take waste and carbon dioxide away from the tissues. Blood vessels are needed to sustain life, because all of the body's tissues rely on their functionality.

There are five types of blood vessels: the arteries, which carry the blood away from the heart; the arterioles; the capillaries, where the exchange of water and chemicals between the blood and the tissues occurs; the venules; and the veins, which carry blood from the capillaries back towards the heart.

The word vascular, meaning relating to the blood vessels, is derived from the Latin vas, meaning vessel. Some structures – such as cartilage, the epithelium, and the lens and cornea of the eye – do not contain blood vessels and are labeled avascular.

Etymology
 artery: late Middle English; from Latin arteria, from Greek artēria, probably from airein ("raise")
 vein: Middle English; from Old French veine, from Latin vena. The earliest senses were "blood vessel" and "small natural underground channel of water".
 capillary: mid 17th century; from Latin capillaris, from capillus ("hair"), influenced by Old French capillaire.

Structure 
The arteries and veins have three layers. The middle layer is thicker in the arteries than it is in the veins:
 The inner layer, tunica intima, is the thinnest layer. It is a single layer of flat cells (simple squamous epithelium) glued by a polysaccharide intercellular matrix, surrounded by a thin layer of subendothelial connective tissue interlaced with a number of circularly arranged elastic bands called the internal elastic lamina. A thin membrane of elastic fibers in the tunica intima run parallel to the vessel.
 The middle layer tunica media is the thickest layer in arteries. It consists of circularly arranged elastic fiber, connective tissue, polysaccharide substances, the second and third layer are separated by another thick elastic band called external elastic lamina. The tunica media may (especially in arteries) be rich in vascular smooth muscle, which controls the caliber of the vessel. Veins don't have the external elastic lamina, but only an internal one. The tunica media is thicker in the arteries rather than the veins.
 The outer layer is the tunica adventitia and the thickest layer in veins. It is entirely made of connective tissue. It also contains nerves that supply the vessel as well as nutrient capillaries (vasa vasorum) in the larger blood vessels.

Capillaries consist of a single layer of endothelial cells with a supporting subendothelium consisting of a basement membrane and connective tissue.

When blood vessels connect to form a region of diffuse vascular supply it is called an anastomosis. Anastomoses provide critical alternative routes for blood to flow in case of blockages.

Leg veins have valves which prevent backflow of the blood being pumped against gravity by the surrounding muscles.

Types 

There are various kinds of blood vessels:
 Arteries
 Elastic arteries
 Distributing arteries
 Arterioles
 Capillaries (smallest blood vessels)
 Venules
 Veins
 Large collecting vessels, such as the subclavian vein, the jugular vein, the renal vein and the iliac vein.
 Venae cavae (the two largest veins, carry blood into the heart).
 Sinusoids
 Extremely small vessels located within bone marrow, the spleen, and the liver.

They are roughly grouped as "arterial" and "venous", determined by whether the blood in it is flowing away from (arterial) or toward (venous) the heart. The term "arterial blood" is nevertheless used to indicate blood high in oxygen, although the pulmonary artery carries "venous blood" and blood flowing in the pulmonary vein is rich in oxygen. This is because they are carrying the blood to and from the lungs, respectively, to be oxygenated.

Function 

Blood vessels function to transport blood. In general, arteries and arterioles transport oxygenated blood from the lungs to the body and its organs, and veins and venules transport deoxygenated blood from the body to the lungs. Blood vessels also circulate blood throughout the circulatory system Oxygen (bound to hemoglobin in red blood cells) is the most critical nutrient carried by the blood. In all arteries apart from the pulmonary artery, hemoglobin is highly saturated (95–100%) with oxygen. In all veins apart from the pulmonary vein, the saturation of hemoglobin is about 75%. (The values are reversed in the pulmonary circulation.) In addition to carrying oxygen, blood also carries hormones, waste products and nutrients for cells of the body.

Blood vessels do not actively engage in the transport of blood (they have no appreciable peristalsis). Blood is propelled through arteries and arterioles through pressure generated by the heartbeat. Blood vessels also transport red blood cells which contain the oxygen necessary for daily activities. The amount of red blood cells present in your vessels has an effect on your health. Hematocrit tests can be performed to calculate the proportion of red blood cells in your blood. Higher proportions result in conditions such as dehydration or heart disease while lower proportions could lead to anemia and long-term blood loss.

Permeability of the endothelium is pivotal in the release of nutrients to the tissue. It is also increased in inflammation in response to histamine, prostaglandins and interleukins, which leads to most of the symptoms of inflammation (swelling, redness, warmth and pain).

Vessel size

Arteries—and veins to a degree—can regulate their inner diameter by contraction of the muscular layer. This changes the blood flow to downstream organs, and is determined by the autonomic nervous system. Vasodilation and vasoconstriction are also used antagonistically as methods of thermoregulation.

The size of blood vessels is different for each of them. It ranges from a diameter of about 25 millimeters for the aorta to only 8 micrometers in the capillaries. This comes out to about a 3000-fold range. Vasoconstriction is the constriction of blood vessels (narrowing, becoming smaller in cross-sectional area) by contracting the vascular smooth muscle in the vessel walls. It is regulated by vasoconstrictors (agents that cause vasoconstriction). These include paracrine factors (e.g. prostaglandins), a number of hormones (e.g. vasopressin and angiotensin) and neurotransmitters (e.g. epinephrine) from the nervous system.

Vasodilation is a similar process mediated by antagonistically acting mediators. The most prominent vasodilator is nitric oxide (termed endothelium-derived relaxing factor for this reason).

Blood flow

The circulatory system uses the channel of blood vessels to deliver blood to all parts of the body. This is a result of the left and right side of the heart working together to allow blood to flow continuously to the lungs and other parts of the body. Oxygen-poor blood enters the right side of the heart through two large veins. Oxygen-rich blood from the lungs enters through the pulmonary veins on the left side of the heart into the aorta and then reaches the rest of the body. The capillaries are responsible for allowing the blood to receive oxygen through tiny air sacs in the lungs. This is also the site where carbon dioxide exits the blood. This all occurs in the lungs where blood is oxygenated.

The blood pressure in blood vessels is traditionally expressed in millimetres of mercury (1 mmHg = 133 Pa). In the arterial system, this is usually around 120 mmHg systolic (high pressure wave due to contraction of the heart) and 80 mmHg diastolic (low pressure wave). In contrast, pressures in the venous system are constant and rarely exceed 10 mmHg.

Vascular resistance occurs where the vessels away from the heart oppose the flow of blood. Resistance is an accumulation of three different factors: blood viscosity, blood vessel length, and vessel radius.

Blood viscosity is the thickness of the blood and its resistance to flow as a result of the different components of the blood. Blood is 92% water by weight and the rest of blood is composed of protein, nutrients, electrolytes, wastes, and dissolved gases. Depending on the health of an individual, the blood viscosity can vary (i.e. anemia causing relatively lower concentrations of protein, high blood pressure an increase in dissolved salts or lipids, etc.).

Vessel length is the total length of the vessel measured as the distance away from the heart. As the total length of the vessel increases, the total resistance as a result of friction will increase.

Vessel radius also affects the total resistance as a result of contact with the vessel wall. As the radius of the wall gets smaller, the proportion of the blood making contact with the wall will increase. The greater amount of contact with the wall will increase the total resistance against the blood flow.

Disease 

Blood vessels play a huge role in virtually every medical condition. Cancer, for example, cannot progress unless the tumor causes angiogenesis (formation of new blood vessels) to supply the malignant cells' metabolic demand. Atherosclerosis, the narrowing of the blood vessels due to the buildup of plaque, and the coronary artery disease that often follows can cause heart attacks or cardiac arrest and is the leading cause of death worldwide resulting in 8.9 million deaths or 16% of all deaths.

Blood vessel permeability is increased in inflammation. Damage, due to trauma or spontaneously, may lead to hemorrhage due to mechanical damage to the vessel endothelium. In contrast, occlusion of the blood vessel by atherosclerotic plaque, by an embolised blood clot or a foreign body leads to downstream ischemia (insufficient blood supply) and possibly infarction (necrosis due to lack of blood supply). Vessel occlusion tends to be a positive feedback system; an occluded vessel creates eddies in the normally laminar flow or plug flow blood currents. These eddies create abnormal fluid velocity gradients which push blood elements such as cholesterol or chylomicron bodies to the endothelium. These deposit onto the arterial walls which are already partially occluded and build upon the blockage.

The most common disease of the blood vessels is hypertension or high blood pressure. This is caused by an increase in the pressure of the blood flowing through the vessels. Hypertension can lead to more serious conditions such as heart failure and stroke. To prevent these diseases, the most common treatment option is medication as opposed to surgery. Aspirin helps prevent blood clots and can also help limit inflammation.

Vasculitis is inflammation of the vessel wall, due to autoimmune disease or infection.

See also 
 Circulatory system
 Heart
 List of bones of the human skeleton
 List of skeletal muscles of the human body
 List of nerves of the human body

References 

Angiology
Soft tissue